Lieutenant General The Honourable Sir James Charlemagne Dormer  (26 January 1834 – 3 May 1893) was a British Army officer.

Military career
Dormer was the younger son of Joseph Thaddeus Dormer, 11th Baron Dormer. He became Chief of Staff of army of occupation in Egypt in 1882, Deputy Adjutant-General for auxiliary forces in 1885 and General Officer Commanding commanding Dublin District in 1886. He went to command the British Troops in Egypt in 1888 and become Commander-in-Chief of the Madras Army and a Member of the Council of the Governor of Fort St George in 1891. He died from injuries on 3rd May after being mauled by a tiger while on a hunt on 25 April 1893 in the Nilgiris. He was succeeded by General Mansfield Clarke as commander-in-chief of the Madras Army. His eldest son Roland succeeded his uncle as Baron Dormer.

References

Sources
 

|-
 

1834 births
1893 deaths
Knights Commander of the Order of the Bath
Younger sons of barons
Commanders-in-chief of Madras